The Noise of Time is a 2016 novel by English author Julian Barnes. It concerns the life of Dmitri Shostakovich, a Russian composer of Soviet times.

References

English novels
2016 British novels
Novels by Julian Barnes
Novels about composers
Dmitri Shostakovich
Jonathan Cape books